Sulfur dibromide is the chemical compound with the formula . It is a toxic gas.

Sulfur dibromide readily decomposes into  and elemental bromine. In analogy to sulfur dichloride, it hydrolyzes in water to give hydrogen bromide, sulfur dioxide and elemental sulfur.

 can be prepared by reacting  with HBr, but due to its rapid decomposition it cannot be isolated at standard conditions. Instead, the more stable  is obtained.

References 

Sulfur halides
Bromides